License plates in Moldova were introduced on November 30, 1992. Currently issued plates consist of six black characters on a white background: three letters and three numbers. On the left part of the plates there is a modified, wider than usual blue euroband having the Moldovan flag instead of the EU symbol and the international country code MD underneath it. The plates are 520 mm wide and 112 mm high, made of metal with embossed characters  using the FE-Schrift font.

Pre-2015 plates have seven characters: two letters for the region (except for Chișinău, which only has the letters C and K), two letters for the series and three digits, all written using the DIN 1451 Mittelschrift font. The left side of the plate carries the coat of arms of Moldova with the country index MD (before 1993 the country index on car plates was MLD) and since November 1, 2011, it has a vertical blue background, similar to the European Union plates. Additionally, the owners could request to have only one or two digits instead of three.

Transnistria

Car designations 
Before 2015, Moldovan vehicle registration plates started with a group of one or two letters, indicating the town or district of registration, followed by two other letters indicating the series and three digits:

As a result of a small part of eastern Moldova not being under Moldovan control (Transnistria), plates with the codes CC, GR, RB, SL, TG and TS are rarely issued. Dubăsari district, using code DB, is partially controlled by Moldova with these plates being regularly issued.

Special plates 
 Government vehicles - Composed of the letters RM (short for 'Republic of Moldova') a single letter representing the authority ('P' for Parliament, 'G' for Government, 'A' for the Chancellery), and three digits. Note: the lower the number [e.g.: 001], the higher the position of its owner [e.g.: RM P 001, RM G 001, RM A 123].
 The President/Presidency number plates are composed of the letters RM followed by four digits. Therefore, the presidential limousine has as its number plate RM 0001.
 Diplomatic vehicles - Composed of two letters ('CD' for Diplomatic Corps, 'TC' for Consular Staff, 'TS' for Service Staff (or cars belonging to the embassy but not only used by embassy officials) and 'CA' for the Administrative body) three digits (representing the embassy) and one-two letters (on CD plates, A or AA usually states the ambassador's car). [e.g.: CD 111 A, CD 112 AA, TC 113 AA, TS 114 AA, CA 115 AA]. This plate uses blue letters in a white background.
 Ministry of Internal Affairs/Police vehicles - composed of the letters MAI and three-four digits. [e.g.: MAI 1234]; Also the Carabinieri Subdivision of the ministry has its own number series - composed of the letters MIC and three-four digits. [e.g.: MIC 1234]. Before the introduction of the MAI series, police vehicles would have POL and three-four digits [e.g.: POL 1234], while the road police would have PR and three-four digits [e.g.: PR 1234]; both series were discontinued and replaced with MAI.
 State Security Service (Serviciul de Protecție și Pază de Stat) vehicles - composed of the letters SP and three digits. [e.g.: SP 123].
 Army vehicles - composed of the letters FA (Forțele Armate - i.e. Military Forces) and four digits. [e.g.: FA 1234].
 Border Control vehicles - composed of the letters DG (Departamentul Grăniceri) and four digits. [e.g.: DG 1234].
 In 1992, when the first series of new license plate were introduced, the plates had a mistake – they used Maldivian Islands country code MLD. Those vehicles were not allowed to cross international borders. In 1993 the mistake was corrected, and the country code was changed to MD.
 Foreign resident vehicles (Not diplomatic) - composed of the letters H, four digits, and dates in the right side of the plate. Uses red letters in a white background. [e.g.: H 1234]

References

External links
 

Moldova
Road transport in Moldova
Moldova transport-related lists